Dirk van den Berg (born May 10, 1966, in Düsseldorf) is a German film director and producer with international experience, known for creative documentaries about urgent issues in the Middle East and Africa.

Biography

A director / writer / producer with vast international experience, DIRK VAN DEN BERG specializes in complex subjects from difficult territories that have an impact on the world.

For almost 25 years, Dirk lived in Rome, Italy where he graduated at the National Academy of Film and Drama, and at Rome University in Media Sciences. Connecting music and drama, he worked as an opera director, started directing and writing feature films, television and documentaries. At the same time, he participated in a growing number of international films as a line-, associate- and executive producer.

Dirk's 2019 international feature "1979 BIG BANG OF THE PRESENT" is roller-coaster documentary about the pivotal events and protagonists that in 1979 gave birth to our present time. The film was co-produced by Dirk's OUTREMER FILM and Pascal Verroust's Paris-based K2 PRODUCTIONS, and co-financed by ARTE, RBB, TVP Poland, ORF and NRK. It is already distributed in more than two dozen countries by Cologne-based world-sales NEW DOCS.

In 2018 Dirk directed the critically acclaimed investigative documentary "1979 THE SIEGE OF MECCA". Five years in the making, "MECCA" dives into Arabia's darkest secret and greatest taboo: the hijacking of the Grand Mosque in Mecca, Islam's holiest shrine, that ultimately marked the beginning of religiously motivated Islamist terrorism as we know it today. Produced jointly by OUTREMER FILM and K2-PRODUCTIONS, the film is supported by ARTE France, NDR, WDR, HR, RBB, ORF, FFHSH Hamburg Film Found and INA France; PBS International handles world sales.

Other films Dirk produced in recent years are: "JAMMING ADDIS", "GUZO - THE ORIGIN OF MUSIC", and "KASHMIR - INDIA'S CROWN JEWEL".

Filmography (selection) 
1979 Big Bang of the Present (2019), co-director & coproducer (with Pascal Verroust)
The Siege of Mecca (2018), director & coproducer
Jamming Addis (2013), director & producer
The Last Princess of Mir (2012), director & coproducer
My Daughter Anne Frank (2014), line producer, director: Raymond Ley
The Great War Diary (2013), creative producer, 4/8x52' internationally co-produced series

Awards 
 1993  Best European Screenplay for the Script "OutreMer"

References

External links 
 
 
 Crew United
 OutreMer Film

Film people from Düsseldorf
German documentary film directors
English-language film directors
1966 births
Living people
Accademia Nazionale di Arte Drammatica Silvio D'Amico alumni